The Croatian Hockey League Season for 2008-2009 was the 18th such season. It was won by KHL Medveščak, making it the team's twelfth championship in the league.

Teams
 KHL Mladost
 KHL Medveščak Zagreb
 KHL Zagreb
 HK Ina Sisak

Regular season

Playoffs

semifinal
Medvescak defeated Sisak in the semifinal series 2–0, in a best of three.
KHL Medveščak – HK Sisak 28:1 (8:0, 7:0, 13:1)
Medveščak – Sisak 5:0 (Sisak couldn't go on due to lack of players, so they forfeited)

Mladost defeated Zagreb in the semifinal series 2–0, in a best of three.
KHL Zagreb – KHL Mladost 4:7 (1:2, 2:3, 1:2)
KHL Mladost – KHL Zagreb 7:2 (2:1, 3:0, 2:1)

final
Medvescak beat Mladost 2–0, in a best of three series.
KHL Medveščak – KHL Mladost 13:3 (2:1, 6:1, 5:1)
KHL Mladost – KHL Medveščak 1:6 (0:1, 1:1, 0:4)

1
Croatian Ice Hockey League
Croatian Ice Hockey League seasons